The Writer's Center, founded in 1976, is an
independent literary center that is housed in a 12,200-square-foot (1,130 m2) facility in the arts and entertainment district of Bethesda, Maryland.  The organization consists of approximately 2,500 writers, editors, small press publishers and other artists who support each other in the creation and marketing of literary texts. The Writer's Center offers workshops, hosts readings and literary events, and maintains a community of writers, workshop leaders, publishers and audiences for contemporary writing at its Bethesda headquarters as well as in Leesburg, Virginia, Arlington, Virginia, and at other locations around the greater Washington, D.C. metropolitan area.

The Writer's Center also publishes Poet Lore, the longest continuously running poetry journal in the United States.

The Writer's Center annually conducts hundreds of workshops in various genres of writing. Workshop participants share with one another their work-in-progress under the guidance of an experienced instructor who is also a published author.

The Writer's Center is a 501(c)(3) nonprofit organization.  The Writer's Center is supported in part by The Arts and Humanities Council of Montgomery County, Maryland, and by grants from organizations including the Maryland State Arts Council, and the National Endowment for the Arts.

The Writer's Center also hosts literary events, readings and conferences; sells books and literary magazines; and offers an environment for writing groups to meet. It is a voluntary, membership organization open to all skill levels.

Notable instructors 
 Lee Gutkind
 Richard Blanco
 Stanley Plumly
 Sandra Beasley
 Rod Jellema
Barbara Goldberg

References

External links

Writer's Center official blog

Buildings and structures in Bethesda, Maryland
Non-profit organizations based in Maryland
Writing circles
Buildings and structures completed in 1976
1976 establishments in Maryland

Arts organizations based in Washington, D.C.